Simani-ye Olya (also Romanized as Sīmānī-ye ‘Olyā; also known as Sīmān-e Bālā, Sīmānī, Sīmānī-ye Bālā, and Sīmānī-ye Bozorg) is a village in Howmeh-ye Shomali Rural District, in the Central District of Eslamabad-e Gharb County, Kermanshah Province, Iran. At the 2006 census, its population was 67, in 13 families.

References 

Populated places in Eslamabad-e Gharb County